The Hottest State is a 2006 drama film written and directed by Ethan Hawke, based on his 1996 novel of the same name. The film debuted at the Venice Film Festival on September 2, 2006, and received a limited theatrical release in the United States on August 24, 2007. It ran for 5 weeks in theaters and grossed $137,341 internationally. The film was subsequently issued on DVD in December 2007.

Synopsis
The film tells the story of 20-year-old actor William, who falls in love for the first time with an aspiring singer, Sarah. As their love blossoms and languishes, young William reexamines himself and his relationship with his mother Jesse and estranged father Vince.

Cast
 Mark Webber as William Harding
 Catalina Sandino Moreno as Sarah
 Michelle Williams as Samantha
 Laura Linney as Jesse
 Ethan Hawke as Vince
 Daniel Ross as Young Vince
 Alexandra Daddario as Kim
 Cherami Leigh as Danielle
 Glen Powell as John Jaegerman
 Sônia Braga as Mrs. Garcia
 Anne Clarke as Young Jesse

Soundtrack

The music score for the film was composed by Grammy-winning musician Jesse Harris. Aside from the inclusion of two score tracks, the album is composed of sixteen original songs interpreted by such musicians as Willie Nelson, Norah Jones, Cat Power, Bright Eyes, and Feist. It was also named one of "The Top 10 CDs of 2007" by the New York Daily News.

Track listing
"Ya No Te Veria Mas (Never See You)" - 2:06 (Rocha)
"Always Seem To Get Things Wrong" - 3:47 (Willie Nelson)
"Somewhere Down The Road" - 2:44 (Feist)
"Big Old House" - 3:54 (Bright Eyes)
"The Speed of Sound" - 4:19 (Emmylou Harris)
"It Will Stay With Us"	- 2:17 (Jesse Harris)
"If You Ever Slip" - 2:33 (The Black Keys)	
"Crooked Lines" - 4:28 (M. Ward)	
"World of Trouble" - 4:35 (Norah Jones)
"Never See You" - 5:04 (Brad Mehldau)
"It's Alright To Fail" - 3:40 (Cat Power)
"One Day The Dam Will Break" - 2:58 (Jesse Harris)
"You, The Queen" - 4:17 (Tony Scherr)
"Morning In A Strange City (Cafe)" - 2:00
"No More" - 3:59 (Rocha)
"Dear Dorothy" - 2:28 (Jesse Harris)
"Never See You" - 2:46 (Rocha)
"There Are No Good Second Chances" - 4:58

References

External links

2006 films
2006 drama films
2006 independent films
American drama films
Films directed by Ethan Hawke
Films shot in New Jersey
Films about actors
Films about singers
Films shot in Texas
Films based on American novels
2000s English-language films
2000s American films